The 2015 European Rugby Champions Cup Final was the final match in the first European Rugby Champions Cup, and the twentieth European club rugby final in general, as the competition replaces the Heineken Cup.

The final was played between the French clubs Clermont and Toulon at Twickenham Stadium on 2 May 2015.

Toulon won the final, beating Clermont by 24 points to 18.
This was the third successive win by Toulon of the top European club rugby competition.

Background
In the Heineken Cup (1995–2014), Toulon won twice, the two last editions of the tournament (2013 and 2014). The first of those finals was also Clermont's only final, and Toulon won 16–15 at the Aviva Stadium in Dublin, Ireland. In 2014, Toulon won 23–6 against England's Saracens at the Millennium Stadium in Cardiff, Wales.

Venue and ticketing
Following a competitive tendering process, the tournament organisers, European Professional Club Rugby, announced in August 2014 that the final would be held in the 82,000 capacity Twickenham Stadium, London on May 2, 2015. The scheduling makes it the earliest in the season that the European final has been held since the 1999 Heineken Cup Final, and is two weeks after the semi-finals are held, providing limited opportunity for supporters of the two finalists to make arrangements to attend. Around 8000 supporters of the two clubs involved in the final travelled to Twickenham, with part of their allocations being returned.

Efforts were made to try and boost attendance by offering free tickets to the final to those that purchased tickets to the Aviva Premiership final that was to be held in the same venue later in the month. However, a technical issue meant that the requirement to purchase the Premiership final tickets was not initially enforced, meaning customers could order only the free ticket and pay just a booking fee.

Route to Final

Note: In all results below, the score of the finalist is given first (H: home; A: away).

Clermont
In the pool stages, third-seeds Clermont topped Pool 1, winning five of six games. Their only defeat was their first game, losing 30–23 away to Saracens at Allianz Park on 18 October 2014. After that, they defeated Munster and Sale Sharks home and away, and concluded on 15 January 2015 with an 18–6 victory over Saracens at the Stade Marcel-Michelin.

On 4 April in the quarter-finals, Clermont hosted English champions Northampton Saints and won 37–5. Fourteen days later in the semi-finals they hosted Saracens, who had defeated them in the previous season's Heineken Cup semi-finals, and won 13–9. Wesley Fofana scored the only try of the match for Clermont, converted by Brock James, who also scored both of their penalties.

Toulon
Seeded second, Toulon won Pool 3 with five victories and one defeat. Their one loss came away to Leicester Tigers on 7 December, 25–21. In the quarter-finals, they triumphed 32–18 over Wasps at the Stade Mayol on 5 April, with tries by Mathieu Bastareaud and Ali Williams. Both were converted by Frédéric Michalak, who also scored all six of their penalties. Two weeks later they won their semi-final 25–20 after extra time against Leinster at the Stade Vélodrome in Marseille. The game finished 12–12 after 80 minutes, and in extra time both teams scored tries: Bryan Habana's for Toulon was converted by Leigh Halfpenny, but Séan O'Brien scored a late try for Leinster.

Match

Details

References

Final
2015
2014–15 in French rugby union
Rugby union in London
European Rugby Champions Cup
European Rugby Champions Cup
ASM Clermont Auvergne matches
RC Toulonnais matches